Grégory Deswarte (born 22 June 1976) is a French former professional footballer who played as a midfielder and defender.

Career 
Deswarte never played in a professional league during his eight-year football career, although he did play in the 2000 Coupe de France Final with Calais RUFC, a match that was won 2–1 by Nantes.

After football 
As of 2020, Deswarte has been director of teams of production in the British-Swedish pharmaceutical company AstraZeneca.

Honours 
Calais
 Coupe de France runner-up: 1999–2000

References 

Living people
1976 births
French footballers
Association football midfielders
Association football defenders
USL Dunkerque players
Calais RUFC players
Championnat National players
Championnat National 2 players
Championnat National 3 players